Rhyners Record Shop is a music store in Trinidad and Tobago. It was founded in 1938 by Hilton Rhyner, who ran the store until his death in 1981. It is now run by his daughters Yvonne and Diana Rhyner. It was originally located at 54 Prince Street in Port of Spain  until it closed 2006, and is now located at Piarco Airport duty-free shop, in Diego Martin, and online. It sells calypso, soca, pop, reggae, and vintage oldies in vinyl record, cassette tape, CD, VHS, and DVD format.

External links
http://www.rhyners.com/
http://www.tntisland.com/musicshops.html
http://legacy.guardian.co.tt/archives/2005-10-09/bussguardian3.html

Music retailers
Companies of Trinidad and Tobago
Retail companies established in 1938
1938 establishments in Trinidad and Tobago